Aphalaridae is a bug family in the superfamily Psylloidea.

Description
There may be five subfamilies, with a worldwide distribution. The metatibia with an open crown of sclerotised apical spurs.

Genera
BioLib includes:
 Agelaeopsylla Taylor, 1990
 Agonoscena Enderlein, 1914
 Ameroscena Burckhardt & Lauterer, 1989
 Anoeconeossa Taylor, 1987
 Anomalopsylla Tuthill, 1952
 Aphalara Förster, 1848
 Apsylla Crawford, 1912
 Australopsylla Tuthill & Taylor, 1955
 Blastopsylla Taylor, 1985
 Blepharocosta Taylor, 1992
 Boreioglycaspis Moore, 1964
 Brachystetha Loginova, 1964
 Caillardia Bergevin, 1931
 Cardiaspina Crawford, 1911
 Celtisaspis Yang & Li, 1982
 Cerationotum Burckhardt & Lauterer, 1989
 Colposcenia Enderlein, 1929
 Craspedolepta Enderlein, 1921
 Crastina Loginova, 1964
 Creiis Scott, 1882
 Crucianus Burckhardt & Lauterer, 1989
 Cryptoneossa Taylor, 1990
 Ctenarytaina Ferris & Klyver, 1932
 Dasypsylla Froggatt, 1900
 Epheloscyta Loginova, 1976
 Eriopsylla Froggatt, 1901
 Eucalyptolyma Froggatt, 1901
 Eumetoecus Loginova, 1961
 Eurhinocola Crawford, 1912
 Eurotica Loginova, 1962
 Glycaspis Taylor, 1960
 Gyropsylla Brèthes, 1921
 Hodkinsonia Burckhardt, Esperito-Santo, Fernandes & Malenovský, 2004
 Hyalinaspis Taylor, 1960
 Kenmooreana Taylor, 1984
 Lanthanaphalara Tuthill, 1959
 Lasiopsylla Froggatt, 1900
 Leptospermonastes Taylor, 1987
 Leurolophus Tuthill, 1942
 Limataphalara Hodkinson, 1992
 Lisronia Loginova, 1976
 Megagonoscena Burckhardt & Lauterer, 1989
 Moraniella Loginova, 1972
 Neaphalara Brown & Hodkinson, 1988
 Notophyllura Hodkinson, 1986
 Pachypsylla Riley, 1885
 Phellopsylla Taylor, 1960
 Phyllolyma Scott, 1882
 Platyobria Taylor, 1987
 Rhinocola Förster, 1848
 Rhodochlanis Loginova, 1964
 Rhombaphalara Loginova, 1964
 Rhusaphalara Park & Lee, 1982
 Spondyliaspis Signoret, 1879
 Syncarpiolyma Froggatt, 1901
 Syncoptozus Enderlein, 1918
 Tainarys Brèthes, 1920
 Tetragonocephala Crawford, 1914
 Togepsylla Kuwayama, 1931
 Xenaphalara Loginova, 1961
extinct genera
 Eogyropsylla Klimaszewski, 1993 †
 Necropsylla Scudder, 1890 †
 Paleopsylloides Bekker-Migdisova, 1985 †
 Proeurotica Bekker-Migdisova, 1985 †
 Protoscena Klimaszewski, 1997 †

References

External links 
 

 
Hemiptera families